The Almer Store is a historic commercial building at 824 Columbia Street in Helena, Arkansas.  Built sometime in the 1870s by Swiss immigrants, it is one of the oldest commercial buildings in Phillips County.  Ulrich Almer is claimed to have built the store out of the parts of a raft he and his wife floated down the Mississippi River.  The Almer's were dairy farmers, who sold their milk products from the building, which later became more of a neighborhood market.  It was in danger of demolition in the early 1970s when it was acquired by the Phillips County Historical Society and restored.

The building was listed on the National Register of Historic Places in 1974.

See also
National Register of Historic Places listings in Phillips County, Arkansas

References

Commercial buildings on the National Register of Historic Places in Arkansas
Commercial buildings completed in 1875
Buildings and structures in Phillips County, Arkansas
National Register of Historic Places in Phillips County, Arkansas
Historic district contributing properties in Arkansas